Peter Dennis Anderson (11 September 1932 – 2 April 2009) was an English former professional footballer who made more than 300 appearances in the Football League playing as an outside forward for Plymouth Argyle and Torquay United.

Anderson was born in Devonport, and began his career with local Devon side Oak Villa. He signed for Plymouth Argyle in July 1950, and made his league debut in April 1953 against Brentford in the Second Division at Home Park. He stayed at Plymouth for more than 12 years, clocking up 259 appearances and 46 goals in all competitions. In December 1962, he moved to Torquay United, scoring on his debut in a 2–0 home win against Hartlepools United on 2 February 1963. He made 77 league appearances and scored 18 goals for Torquay. He remained a regular until the 1964–65 season when he lost his place to Bill Atkinson, before moving into non-league football with Bideford, where a broken leg forced him to retire in 1966.

References

External links
 

1932 births
2009 deaths
Sportspeople from Devonport, Plymouth
English footballers
Association football forwards
Oak Villa F.C. players
Plymouth Argyle F.C. players
Torquay United F.C. players
Bideford A.F.C. players
English Football League players
Association football outside forwards